Ascocoryne is a genus of fungi in the family Helotiaceae. It was circumscribed in 1967 by James Walton Groves and Doreen Wilson as a genus segregate from Coryne. , Index Fungorum places five species in Ascocoryne.

References

Helotiales genera
Helotiaceae
Taxa described in 1967